KKCL may refer to:

 KKCL (AM), a radio station (1550 AM) licensed to serve Golden, Colorado, United States
 KKCL-FM, a radio station (98.1 FM) licensed to serve Lorenzo, Texas, United States
 KXJJ, a radio station (1570 AM) licensed to serve Loveland, Colorado, which held the call sign KKCL from 2015 to 2016